"Linear Motor Girl" is the first major label single (sixth overall) of Japanese electropop girl group Perfume. It was released on September 21, 2005 in Japan, and was the group's first release under Tokuma. The single is recognized and considered the group's debut single by Japanese media.

Background 
"Linear Motor Girl" is the 6th single released by Perfume. The single sold for four weeks in the charts and sold 2,600 copies. After that, their releases started to move up on the charts.

Track listing

References

Perfume (Japanese band) songs
Japanese-language songs
Songs written by Yasutaka Nakata
Billboard Japan Hot 100 number-one singles
2005 singles
Song recordings produced by Yasutaka Nakata
2005 songs